Hillman Terome Frazier (born July 17, 1950 in Jackson) is an American politician who is a Democratic member of the Mississippi Senate; he has represented the 27th District since 1993. A Protestant, he is married to the former Jean Clayton. From 1980 until 1993 he served in the Mississippi House of Representatives; he has also previously participated in Leadership Jackson. Eisenhower Fellowships selected Hillman Terome Frazier as a U.S.A. Eisenhower Fellow in 1998.

In 1995, he alerted the Mississippi legislature to the fact that the state had never ratified the Thirteenth Amendment to the United States Constitution outlawing slavery, after which the legislature voted to ratify the amendment.

Education
Jackson State University
George Washington University National Law Center

State Senate Committee Membership
Housing - Chair
Ethics - Vice-Chair
Appropriations
Congressional Redistricting
Interstate and Federal Cooperation
Investigate State Offices
Judiciary, Division A
Legislative Budget Committee
Legislative Reapportionment
Municipalities
Public Health and Welfare
Universities and Colleges

References

External links
Mississippi State Senate - Hillman Frazier official government website
 Leadership Jackson

African-American state legislators in Mississippi
Democratic Party Mississippi state senators
1950 births
Living people
Jackson State University alumni
Democratic Party members of the Mississippi House of Representatives
George Washington University Law School alumni
People from Hinds County, Mississippi
21st-century American politicians